Sao  is a prograde irregular satellite of Neptune. It was discovered by Matthew J. Holman et al. on August 14, 2002.

Sao orbits Neptune at a distance of about 22.4 million km and is about 44 kilometers in diameter (assuming an albedo of 0.04).

Sao follows an exceptionally inclined and moderately eccentric orbit illustrated on the diagram in relation to other irregular satellites of Neptune. The satellites above the horizontal axis are prograde, the satellites beneath it are retrograde. The yellow segments extend from the pericentre to the apocentre, showing the eccentricity.

The satellite is in Kozai resonance, i.e. its inclination and eccentricity are coupled (the inclination of the orbit decreases while eccentricity increases and vice versa).

Sao, or Neptune XI, like many of the outer satellites of Neptune, is named after one of the Nereids; Sao was associated with sailing and is referred to as "The rescuer" or "Safety". Before the announcement of its name on February 3, 2007 (IAUC 8802), Sao was known provisionally as S/2002 N 2.

References 

 Ephemeris from MPC
 Mean orbital parameters from JPL

External links 
 Matthew Holman's Neptune's page
 David Jewitt's pages
 Scott Sheppard's pages

Moons of Neptune
Irregular satellites
 
20020814
Moons with a prograde orbit